Dysgonia rigidistria  is a moth of the family Noctuidae first described by Achille Guenée in 1852. It is found on the Indian peninsula and Sri Lanka.

Taxonomy
Dysgonia calefasciens (Walker, 1858) and Dysgonia correctana (Walker, 1865) are no longer considered synonyms of Dysgonia rigidistria.

Description
Its wingspan is about 56 mm. It is a bronze-brown moth. Forewings with a white speck found in the cell. There is an erect straight medial whitish band with a dark line on its outer edge. An indistinct dark waved sub-marginal line and a marginal black specks series can be seen. Abdomen and hindwings are fuscous, where there are traces of medial and sub-marginal pale lines on hindwings. A marginal black speck series present. Ventral side with two waved postmedial line to each wing.

References

External links
Image

Dysgonia